Protaephagus is a genus of moths of the family Incurvariidae.

Selected species
Protaephagus capensis Scoble, 1980

References

Incurvariidae
Moths of Africa
Adeloidea genera